Living Out Loud is the debut studio album by Canadian country music singer Aaron Lines. The album was released by RCA Nashville. It was nominated for Country Recording of the Year at the 2004 Juno Awards. In the U.S., the album produced two chart singles in "You Can't Hide Beautiful" and "Love Changes Everything". The former peaked at No. 4 on Hot Country Songs and No. 38 on the Billboard Hot 100, while the latter peaked at No. 39 on the US country charts.

Track listing

Personnel
As listed in liner notes.
Mike Brignardello – bass guitar
Tom Bukovac – electric guitar
Eric Darken – percussion
Dan Dugmore – pedal steel guitar
Chris Farren – acoustic guitar, electric guitar, keyboards, Hammond B-3 organ, background vocals
Joel Feeney – background vocals
Kim Fleming – background vocals
Shannon Forrest – drums, drum programming
Tony Harrell – piano, keyboards, Hammond B-3 organ
Jeff King – electric guitar, gut string guitar, bouzouki
Aaron Lines – lead vocals
Shawn Allan Klaiber – background vocals
Chris J. McDonald – trombone
Wendy Moten – background vocals
Michael Rhodes – bass guitar
Jason Sellers – background vocals
Bobby Terry – acoustic guitar, drum programming
George Tidwell – trumpet

Strings performed by the Nashville String Machine, arranged by Jeff Lippencott and Chris Farren. Carl Gorodetzky, concert master.

Chart performance

References

2003 debut albums
Aaron Lines albums
RCA Records albums
Albums produced by Chris Farren (country musician)